The People's Movement Party (PMP) is a minor extra-parliamentary nominally centre-right Christian democratic, national-conservative  political party in Romania.

History
The PMP was created as a political foundation in March, 2013 by supporters of then incumbent state president Traian Băsescu, following his break with the leadership of the Democratic Liberal Party (PDL) around former Senate president Vasile Blaga. It was transformed into a political party in July, 2013 and re-launched on 29 January 2014.

The PMP identifies itself as Christian democratic and liberal. The new party's chairman after June 2014 was former minister of regional development and tourism and Băsescu's confidante Elena Udrea. Other notable members include former culture minister Theodor Paleologu, former foreign minister Teodor Baconschi, former minister of education Daniel Funeriu, or member of European Parliament (MEP) Cristian Preda, Băsescu's daughter and MEP Elena Băsescu. and former Foreign Minister and head of the presidential administration Cristian Diaconescu.

In the 2014 European election, the party won 6.2% of the votes and two of Romania's 32 seats. Its members of the European Parliament Siegfried Mureșan and Cristian Preda joined the European People's Party Group (EPP), although Preda has since been expelled from the party. On 12 September 2014, the PMP was admitted as a full member to the European People's Party (EPP).

For the November 2014 presidential election, the PMP nominated Elena Udrea. She was also endorsed by the Christian Democratic National Peasants' Party (PNȚ-CD). With 5.2% of the popular vote, she was placed fourth and did not qualify for the second round.  The party asked its voters to support Klaus Iohannis of the National Liberal Party (PNL) in the runoff election.

On 12 July 2016, Traian Băsescu announced that the National Union for the Progress of Romania (UNPR) would merge with PMP on 20 July 2016. Subsequently, the union between the two parties failed and PMP lost several representatives both in the Senate and in the Chamber of Deputies.

In the 2020 legislative election, due to poor presence at the polling stations (33.30%) caused by the coronavirus pandemic, the party failed to earn 5% of the public vote and thereby failed to enter parliament. The episode was controversial to say at least as the party was very close to the threshold and had zero votes in several polling stations in which they had party representatives whose votes were nowhere to be found. As a result, the party contested the results and demanded recounting the votes in as many as 1,090 polling stations. Nonetheless, this demand was ultimately refused by the Central Electoral Bureau (BEC). This failure led the party president, Eugen Tomac, to resign from the party's leadership.

After a party congress held on 7 March 2021, Cristian Diaconescu was elected the new president and designated the party's candidate for the forthcoming 2024 Romanian presidential election. On 19 February 2022, Eugen Tomac returned to the presidency of the party.

Ideology 

When it was founded, the party identified itself as Christian democratic, conservative, and economic liberal.

However, in the later years, the party became more traditionalist. Nowadays, it opposes the immigration of foreigners into EU (especially of Muslims), Marxism, socialism, globalisation, and same-sex marriage.

Leadership

Notable members

Current notable members 
 Traian Băsescu;
 Eugen Tomac;
 Elena Băsescu;
 Robert Turcescu;
 Mihail Neamțu.

Former notable members 
 Theodor Paleologu;
 Elena Udrea;
 Cristian Preda
 Adrian Papahagi;
 Cristian Diaconescu;
 Daniel Funeriu;
 Siegfried Mureșan.

Electoral history

Legislative elections 

Notes:

1 These MPs were previously elected on the PDL list of the larger ARD electoral alliance at the 2012 legislative election.

Local elections

National results

Mayor of Bucharest

Presidential elections 

Notes:

1  Elena Udrea's candidacy to presidency in 2014 was also supported by the Christian Democratic National Peasants' Party (PNȚCD).

European elections

References

External links

2013 establishments in Romania
Christian democratic parties in Europe
Eastern Orthodox political parties
Conservative parties in Romania
Liberal parties in Romania
Member parties of the European People's Party
National conservative parties
Political parties established in 2013
Pro-European political parties in Romania
Registered political parties in Romania
Romanian nationalist parties
Anti-immigration politics in Europe
Anti-Islam sentiment in Europe